Mecheri is a town in Mettur taluk, Salem district, Tamil Nadu, India.

Geography

Climate
Mecheri receives little rainfall and has moderately dry weather except during the monsoon season. Summer begins around March. The highest temperatures normally occur during May, which is dry. The climate becomes more temperate in June and July during the pre-monsoon period, and August is overcast and dry. The northeast monsoon occurs from September to November, and the rains disappear by December.

Demographics

Population 
In the 2011 Census of India, Mecheri had a population of 25,676. Males constituted 53 percent of the population, and females 47 percent; 12 percent of the population was under six years of age. Mecheri had a literacy rate of 59 percent, lower than the national literacy rate of 77 percent.
== Economy ==

Livestock
Mecheri is known for its Kurumbai sheep. To develop and encourage sheep farming, the government of Tamil Nadu established the Mecheri Sheep Research Station in 1978 in Mecheri's Pottaneri panchayat.

Culture

Tourist attractions 
Mecheri is a holy site. Rajagopuram is the temple's main entrance, and Mecheri has a number of other temples.

Transport 

Mecheri is on State Highway 20, the Bhavani-Thoppur road. Scheduled bus service is available to Chennai, Bangalore, Erode, Coimbatore and Mysore from MSS and KPN Travels.

References

Cities and towns in Salem district